Joanna Skowroń (born April 16, 1979 in Gorzów Wielkopolski) is a Polish sprint canoer who competed from the late 1990s to the mid-2000s. She won eleven medals at the ICF Canoe Sprint World Championships with a gold (K-4 1000 m: 2002), five silvers (K-2 200 m: 2002, K-4 200 m: 2005, K-4 500 m: 2003, 2005, K-4 1000 m: 2001) and five bronzes (K-2 500 m: 2003, K-2 1000 m: 2005, K-4 200 m: 2001, 2003; K-4 500 m: 1999).

Skowroń also competed in two Summer Olympics, earning her best finish of fourth twice in the K-4 500 m event (2000, 2004).

References

1979 births
Canoeists at the 2000 Summer Olympics
Canoeists at the 2004 Summer Olympics
Living people
Olympic canoeists of Poland
Polish female canoeists
Sportspeople from Gorzów Wielkopolski
ICF Canoe Sprint World Championships medalists in kayak